NGC 623 is a large elliptical galaxy located in the Sculptor constellation at a distance of about 400 million light-years away from the Milky Way. It was discovered by British astronomer John Herschel in 1837.

See also 
 List of NGC objects (1–1000)

References 

Elliptical galaxies
Sculptor (constellation)
0623
005898